Alan Keith Huggins (born May 1936) MBE is a philatelist who in 1981, with Marcus Samuel, was awarded the Crawford Medal for his work Specimen stamps and stationery of Great Britain.

He specializes in British postal stationery and has been a philatelic expert in the subject since 1980 and an AIEP (International Association of Philatelic Experts) member since 2001.

He signed the Roll of Distinguished Philatelists in 1983 and served as Keeper of the Roll from 2003-2008. He is an Honorary Fellow of the Royal Philatelic Society, London and received its Bacon Medal in 2014 and its Tilleard Medal in 2018. He received the Collectors Club’s Lichtenstein Medal in 1994, the FIP Medal for Service in 2004 and the FEPA Award for Service in 2009.

In the January 1996 New Year Honours list, Huggins was honoured with the award of Membership of the Order of the British Empire for services to the British Philatelic Trust. This was the first occasion this honour was given within philately, other than those awarded directly by the monarch to the Keeper of the Royal Philatelic Collection.

Huggins is a past President of the Royal Philatelic Society London and also a past Chairman of The Postal Stationery Society (1992 - 1999).

Huggins was trained as a biochemist. His PhD thesis was titled Uncoupling reagents and intermediary metabolism in isolated tissues (1962; King's College School of Medicine and Dentistry). He followed a career as an academic and then as a University Administrator. He was Deputy Secretary at University College London from 1986–90 and its Pro-Provost from 1997-2002.

Philatelic publications
 British Postal Stationery: A Priced Handbook of the Postal Stationery of Great Britain. London: Great Britain Philatelic Society, London, 1970 188p.
 The De La Rue Punch Book. London: Robson Lowe, 1979  16p. (Published as a Supplement to The Philatelic Journal of Great Britain, June, 1979.)
 (with Marcus Samuel) Specimen Stamps and Stationery of Great Britain. Safron Walden: G.B. Philatelic Publications Ltd., 1980 254p.
 The Origin, Development and Usage of British Postal Stationery in the Nineteenth Century; notes on a display presented to The Collectors Club, New York, Wednesday, 5th June 1991. London: The Author, 1991 8p.
 Competitive Exhibiting at Local and Federation Level. London: The Association of British Philatelic Societies Ltd, with support by the British Philatelic Trust, 2001 12p. Series Title: ABPS Booklet; No. 3.
 (with Peter Langmead) The Telegraph Stamps and Stationery of Great Britain 1851-1954. Putney: Published by GB Philatelic Publications Ltd. for the Great Britain Philatelic Society, 2003  190p.
 (with Colin Baker) Collect British Postal Stationery: A Simplified Listing of British Postal Stationery 1840 to 2007. Gerrards Cross: GB Philatelic Publications Ltd, 2007  151p.
 (with Edward Klempka) Great Britain: The 1840 Prepaid Parliamentary Envelopes. London: The Royal Philatelic Society London, 2013  99p.
 (with Alan Holyoake) The Mulready Postal Stationery: Its Genesis, Production and Usage. Sutton Coldfield: GB Philatelic Publications, 2015  211p.

References

Living people
British philatelists
Presidents of the Royal Philatelic Society London
1936 births
Signatories to the Roll of Distinguished Philatelists